Neoligia crytora is a species of cutworm or dart moth in the family Noctuidae.

The MONA or Hodges number for Neoligia crytora is 9410.

References

Further reading

 
 
 
 

Noctuinae
Articles created by Qbugbot
Moths described in 1950